The 2023 Penn State Nittany Lions football team will represent Pennsylvania State University in the 2023 NCAA Division I FBS football season as a member of the Big Ten Conference. The team is expected to be led by James Franklin in his tenth year as Penn State's head coach.

Schedule

Game Summaries

West Virginia

Delaware

at Illinois

Iowa

at Northwestern

UMass

at Ohio State

Indiana

at Maryland

Michigan

Rutgers

at Michigan State

Roster

References

Penn State
Penn State Nittany Lions football seasons
Penn State Nittany Lions football